The Prowers County Building, at 301 S. Main St. in Lamar, Colorado, was built in 1928.  It was a work of Robert K. Fuller and of A.E.Danielson & Sons in Classical Revival style.  It served as a courthouse and has also been known as Prowers County Courthouse.  It was listed on the National Register of Historic Places in 1981.

Its NRHP nomination asserted that: "In its innovative blending of academic and moderne forms, the Prowers County Building is clearly one of the most unique and distinguished county courthouses in the state."

An exterior shot of the building is used to represent the fictional Eagleton correctional facility in the Parks and Recreation episode Eagleton (Parks and Recreation).

References 

Courthouses on the National Register of Historic Places in Colorado
Neoclassical architecture in Colorado
Government buildings completed in 1928
Prowers County, Colorado
County courthouses in Colorado
National Register of Historic Places in Prowers County, Colorado